Sérgio Gabriel da Silva Andrade (born 6 December 1982), known as Serginho, is a Portuguese professional footballer who plays as a goalkeeper.

He played 12 Primeira Liga matches for Vitória de Guimarães and Santa Clara, but spent most of his career in LigaPro, making nearly 300 appearances for eight clubs, including three spells at Santa Clara.

Club career
Born in Souto (Santa Maria da Feira), Serginho spent his youth career at local clubs C.D. Feirense, C.D. Soutense and C.F. União de Lamas. He made his Segunda Liga debut for the last of those on the final day of 2000–01, coming on as a substitute for Ivo Oliveira for the last four minutes of a 2–0 home loss against C.D. Santa Clara. He appeared in a handful more matches over the next four seasons, with the latter half in the third division.

After a year in the fourth tier with Lusitânia FC, Serginho was signed by Vitória S.C. of the Primeira Liga in the summer of 2006. He made his debut in the last matchday, 19 minutes as a replacement for Nilson in a 1–1 draw with S.C. Olhanense at the Estádio D. Afonso Henriques. Having barely made a mark during his tenure, he left on loan for division-two S.C. Covilhã in January 2011 on loan for the rest of the campaign.

In January 2012, Vitória and Serginho reached an agreement to sever his contract, and he moved to Portimonense S.C. thereafter. After a year playing regularly for F.C. Arouca, promoted as runners-up to C.F. Os Belenenses, he joined Santa Clara in July 2013. He briefly left the team from the Azorean for G.D. Chaves, before rescinding his contract there and heading back in August 2014.

After one year as an ever-present fixture for Gil Vicente FC, Serginho signed for a third time to Santa Clara in 2016. In April the following year, he agreed to an extension until June 2018. He won a second promotion as runners-up in 2017–18, but Marco Pereira was preferred for the ensuing top-flight campaign.

In June 2019, Serginho became Varzim S.C.'s first new signing of the season.

References

External links

1982 births
Living people
Sportspeople from Santa Maria da Feira
Portuguese footballers
Association football goalkeepers
Primeira Liga players
Liga Portugal 2 players
Segunda Divisão players
C.F. União de Lamas players
Lusitânia F.C. players
Vitória S.C. players
S.C. Covilhã players
Portimonense S.C. players
F.C. Arouca players
C.D. Santa Clara players
G.D. Chaves players
Gil Vicente F.C. players
Varzim S.C. players
C.D. Trofense players